1-Naphthaleneacetamide (NAAm) is a synthetic auxin that acts as a rooting hormone. 

It can be found in commercial products such as Rootone.

See also
 1-Naphthaleneacetic acid
 Plant hormones

Auxins
Acetamides
1-Naphthyl compounds